The Accountant of Auschwitz is a Canadian documentary film, produced by Ricki Gurwitz and Ric Esther Bienstock and directed by Matthew Shoychet. The film centres on lawyer Thomas Walther's prosecution in the 2010s of former Schutzstaffel member Oskar Gröning, focusing in part on the ethical debate around whether there's any useful purpose to be served in prosecuting an elderly man for crimes he committed 60 years earlier.

The film premiered at the Hot Docs Canadian International Documentary Festival in 2018, and later had a brief theatrical run before airing on Documentary Channel and Netflix.

The film won four Canadian Screen Awards at the 8th Canadian Screen Awards in 2020, for Best History Documentary Program or Series, Best Editorial Research (Ricki Gurwitz), Best Visual Research (Ricki Gurwitz), and Best Music in a Non-Fiction Program or Series (Ken Myhr). It was also nominated, but did not win, for Best Editing in a Documentary Program or Series (Ted Husband) and Best Direction in a Documentary Program (Shoychet).

References

External links
 

2018 films
2018 documentary films
Canadian documentary films
Documentary films about Nazis
2010s English-language films
2010s Canadian films